Héctor Manuel Mendoza Ripoll (born March 5, 1994) is a Cuban professional baseball pitcher who is a free agent. He has played in Nippon Professional Baseball (NPB) for the Yomiuri Giants.

Career

Yomiuri Giants
Mendoza played with the Isla de la Juventud of the Cuban National Series from 2011 to 2015. On July 17, 2014, Mendoza signed with the Yomiuri Giants of Nippon Professional Baseball. He played with the Yomiuri Giants organization from 2014 to 2016. In 5 games split between two seasons, Mendoza recorded a 7.71 ERA with 7 strikeouts. Mendoza was released by the Giants on December 2, 2016.

St. Louis Cardinals
On June 7, 2017, Mendoza signed a minor league contract with the St. Louis Cardinals worth $500,000. After signing, Mendoza made his professional debut with the DSL Cardinals. After compiling a 2.57 ERA in seven innings, he was promoted to the Palm Beach Cardinals where he finished the season with a 0-6 record and 5.54 ERA in 19 relief appearances. He began 2018 with the Springfield Cardinals and was promoted to the Memphis Redbirds in May. He finished the year with a 4-4 record and 5.10 ERA in 49 appearances between the two teams. Mendoza recorded a 2.00 ERA in 6 games with Springfield before he was released by the Cardinals on June 4, 2019.

Cuban National Baseball Team
Mendoza won with his national team, the gold medal of the 2014 Central American and Caribbean Games in Veracruz, Mexico.

Mendoza won the title of best right-handed relief pitcher and gold medal in the 2015 Caribbean Series.

References

External links
, or NPB

1993 births
Living people
Baseball players at the 2015 Pan American Games
Central American and Caribbean Games gold medalists for Cuba
Competitors at the 2014 Central American and Caribbean Games
Defecting Cuban baseball players
Cuban expatriate baseball players in Japan
Dominican Summer League Cardinals players
Cuban expatriate baseball players in the Dominican Republic
Isla de la Juventud players
Nippon Professional Baseball pitchers
Palm Beach Cardinals players
Pan American Games bronze medalists for Cuba
Pan American Games medalists in baseball
People from Isla de la Juventud
Yomiuri Giants players
2015 WBSC Premier12 players
Central American and Caribbean Games medalists in baseball
Medalists at the 2015 Pan American Games